Moonbeam Lake is a lake in geographic Alexandra Township in Unorganized North Cochrane District, Cochrane District, in Northeastern Ontario, Canada. It is in the James Bay drainage basin.

The primary inflows are Moonbeam Creek, at the southwest, and Strickland Creek, at the south. The primary outflow, at the north, is Moonbeam Creek, which flows via the Poplar Rapids River, the Mattagami River and the Moose River to James Bay.

See also
List of lakes in Ontario

References

Lakes of Cochrane District